The Daylami family was an Iranian family native to Persian Iraq and Gilan, who served the Turkmen Aq Qoyunlu and then later the Safavid dynasty.

References

Sources 
 
 
  
 

Families of Safavid Iran
Families of the Aq Qoyunlu